The Wētā 4.4 Trimaran is a 4.4 metre (14 foot) sailing dinghy conceived and developed in New Zealand from 2001-2006 by Roger and Chris Kitchen and others with original drawings by TC Design's Tim Clissold.

Design
The boat is constructed from fibreglass and carbon fibre, and is popular as a racing boat or for recreational sailing. It has added stability and righting moment from the trimaran amas or floats.

Recognition
The Wētā Trimaran is recognized as one design class by Yachting New Zealand, the French Sailing Federation, and the Royal Yachting Association in the UK.
It has been approved for the Paralympics and World Masters Games.

Awards
In 2010 the Wētā Trimaran was awarded Boat of the Year by Sailing World magazine.

Builds
There are two distinct builds of the Wētā Trimaran, the 'original build' and the '2015 Wētā' which was created from a new mold and included (mostly internal) hull revisions.
In April 2017, Wētā announced the availability of a foam-core Wētā which as well as being stiffer is right on the minimum weight of 120Kg in the class rules.

Original build
Early prototypes were produced in New Zealand but from 2006 to 2014 the 'original build' was manufactured in China for Wētā Marine and sold internationally. In 2020, 1300+ boats have been sold to date with the largest fleets in France and the USA. The original sails were manufactured by Dutch windsurfing sail-maker, Gaastra.

The design evolved over time:
 Color changes (Most boats were produced to four RAL color codes: Red (3020), Yellow (1018), Green (6018), Light Grey (7035). Some very early boats featured alternative red and yellow hues). Current 2020 colours are White, Grey, Blue, Yellow or Orange.
 Three rudders
New deeper daggerboard
Mylar sails (dacron optional)
Minor modifications to forestay tack fitting
Optional furling jib
Optional mainsails:
Small training mainsail
Heavy weather mainsail
'Resort' mainsail (Dacron)

2015 Wētā 
In 2014 the new 2015 Wētā was announced with a switch to a new manufacturer, Xtreme Sailing Products (XSP), based in Singapore (with the factory in nearby Batam, Indonesia).
XSP produced a new mould and made structural and cosmetic improvements, including:
 Deck (screecher furler cleat on cockpit side, swaged stays, Liros ropes and optional hiking strap, enhanced grip, new raised foredeck detail for enhanced strength and durability)
 Floats (Change to seamless construction and removal of rear lip. Switch to Nairn hatches.)
 Sails (Switch of manufacturer to North Sails)
 Centrecase (precision fit via nylon pile)
 Trampoline (improved alignment via custom carbon pads)
 Rudder bar and gudgeons (strength and durability enhancement)

In September 2014 the first of the new '2015 Wētā' build were shipped to customers in the US.

2017 Foam Core Wētā & Square Top Sail 
In April 2017, Wētā announced the availability of a foam-core hull (right on the class weight limit of 120Kg) and bi-radial cut 9.3 m square top mainsail (compared to the original Pin-head 8.3 m mainsail. Nearly all Wētā built since 2018 have been foam core and the Square Top sail has been adopted as the standard sail for racing in most regions.

2020 Self-tacking jib kit
In February 2020, Wētā announced the availability of a Self-Tacking Jib kit designed to be retrofitted to existing hulls or as an addition to new boats. The kit allows tacking without adjusting the jib sheets and includes a slightly smaller jib which is 3.0sqm. Around 6% less sail area than the standard jib at 3.2sqm.

2020 Twin Tiller Extension kit
In August 2020, a twin tiller extension kit was announced. The kit consists of a second tiller extension, bolts to attach both extensions to the tiller and a shock-cord and ring system to prevent the inactive tiller dragging in the water. The benefit is that you no longer have to pass the tiller around the stern when tacking.

2022 Branding Revision 
In April 2022, the branding was changed from "Weta: Fun. Fast. Easy" to "Wētā: Life's Better". The addition of the macrons was made to properly align with the Māori language definition.

Performance
Top recorded speed (best 10 second average): 21.4 kn (24.63 MPH) by Tom Kirkman, USA.
Rigging time: 20 minutes

See also
 List of multihulls

References

External links
 Wētā Marine
 TC Design
 Wētā Australia
 Wētā classe France
 British Wētā Class Association
 Australian Wētā Class
 Wētā Class of North America
 Wētā Forum, Buyers Guide and Wētā Wiki - everything you need to know in one place

 Video of the High Sierra Regatta Race 1 Wētā Tri, "Mary Ann", Fresno Yacht Club's "High Sierra Regatta", July 2013.
 to celebrate the 1000th boat sold

Trimarans